Régis Junior Koundjia-Sindo (born 8 November 1983) is a Central African former professional basketball player. He played college basketball for the LSU Tigers and George Washington Colonials from 2003 to 2007. Koundjia played with the Central African Republic national basketball team in the FIBA Africa Championship games in 2005, 2007 and 2009.

He signed with the Vermont Frost Heaves of the Premier Basketball League (PBL) for the 2008–09 season after he played in the NBA Summer League for the San Antonio Spurs.

Personal life
Koundjia was born in Bangui, Central African Republic. His father, a Central African Republic diplomat, was killed by poisoning in 1991. Koundjia majored in sociology at George Washington University.

References

External links
 Profile at ESPN.com
 College statistics

1983 births
Living people
Central African Republic men's basketball players
LSU Tigers basketball players
George Washington Colonials men's basketball players
Parade High School All-Americans (boys' basketball)
People from Bangui